Polizei is the German word for police. Police in Germany, Austria and Switzerland consist of different agencies. It might refer to:

National agencies
Bundespolizei (Germany), Federal Police of Germany
Bundespolizei (Austria), Federal Police of Austria
Bundeskriminalamt (Germany), Federal Criminal Office of Germany, comparable to the FBI
Bundeskriminalamt (Austria), Federal Investigation Bureau of Austria
Polizei beim Deutschen Bundestag, the German Parliament Police

State agencies
Landespolizei, state police of Germany
Landeskriminalamt, an independent agency in most German states that is subordinate to the state ministry of the interior

Police units
Autobahnpolizei, highway police
Bahnpolizei, railway police
Bereitschaftspolizei, police support group and riot police of Germany
Kriminalpolizei, criminal Investigation Police in Germany, Austria and Switzerland; similar to the British Criminal Investigation Department
Schutzpolizei, a branch of the Landespolizei, the state (land) level police of the German states
Spezialeinsatzkommando, specialized operation armed response units of the sixteen German state police forces
Wasserschutzpolizei, water police that patrols the waterways, lakes and harbours of Germany

Defunct agencies
Volkspolizei, the People's Police in the German Democratic Republic (East Germany)
Transportpolizei, the transit police in the German Democratic Republic (East Germany)
Polizei der Freien Stadt Danzig, state constabulary of the Free City of Danzig, including the Sicherheitspolizei (1919-1921) and the Schutzpolizei (1921-1945)
Ordnungspolizei, regular police force of National Socialist (Nazi) Germany
4th SS Polizei Panzergrenadier Division, SS unit formed by Ordnungspolizei members
Sicherheitspolizei, secret police in Germany until the outbreak of World War II
Gestapo (Geheime Staatspolizei), secret police of the Nazi regime
Geheime Feldpolizei, secret military police of Nazi Germany
Preußische Geheimpolizei, the Prussian Secret Police